Taste receptor type 2 member 46 is a protein that in humans is encoded by the TAS2R46 gene.

References

Further reading

Human taste receptors